Thompson-Ray House is a historic home located at Gas City, Grant County, Indiana.  It was built between 1902 and 1906, and is a -story, Late Victorian Free Classic style brick and stone dwelling. It has a cruciform plan and gable roof.  It features porches with multiple classical columns and a porte cochere.

It was listed on the National Register of Historic Places in 2009.

It currently houses LEAD Inc., the Gas City Chamber of Commerce, and the Grant County Convention and Visitor's Bureau.

References

Houses on the National Register of Historic Places in Indiana
Victorian architecture in Indiana
Houses completed in 1906
Buildings and structures in Grant County, Indiana
National Register of Historic Places in Grant County, Indiana
1906 establishments in Indiana